Jeroen Bijl (born 5 September 1966 in Rotterdam) is a Dutch former volleyball player who played for the national team. After his sport career he became director of PEC Zwolle. He was chef de mission of NOC*NSF and within this function the main person responsible for the Dutch team at the 2018 Winter Olympics.

References

1966 births
Living people
Dutch men's volleyball players
Sportspeople from Rotterdam